Udovo  is a village in the southeastern part of North Macedonia, near the city of Valandovo, and under the Valandovo Municipality.

History 
Udovo is an old inhabited place, before the First Balkan War many Turks lived in the town. The old village of Udovo was located in present lower neighbourhood (Lower Udovo). Few turkish houses existed in upper neighbourhood of Udovo (Upper Udovo). After wars Turks migrated to Turkey.

Demographics
According to the 2002 census, the village had a total of 851 inhabitants. Ethnic groups in the village include:
 Macedonians 838
 Turks 7
 Serbs 2
 Others 4

Sports
Local football club FK Mladost plays in the Macedonian Third League (Southeast Division).

References

Villages in Valandovo Municipality